This is a list of dramas released by the Hanoi Radio Television network.

#B

#C

#Đ

#G

#H

#K

#L

#M

#N

#Q

#S

#T

#Ư

#V

#X

See also
 List of dramas broadcast by Vietnam Television (VTV)
 List of dramas broadcast by Vietnam Digital Television (VTC)
List of programmes broadcast by Hanoi Radio Television

Notes
HAVISCO is short for Hanoi Audio Visual Company (Vietnamese: Công ty nghe nhìn Hà Nội), a subunit of Hanoi Radio Television

References

External links
hanoitv.vn – Official HanoiTV Website 

Vietnam Television original programming
Hanoi Radio Television (HanoiTV)
HanoiTV